Hantan Raharvel (born 28 August 1996) is a Malagasy swimmer. She competed in the women's 50 metre freestyle event at the 2017 World Aquatics Championships.

References

1996 births
Living people
Malagasy female swimmers
Place of birth missing (living people)
Malagasy female freestyle swimmers